Heaven is the debut album of British neo soul singer Jason Rowe, performing under the name Jai. The album was released on 11 November 1997. While well-reviewed, it would be Rowe's only album for nearly ten years, with Rowe later releasing his second album, Lovelife, under his full name in February 2007.

The album includes covers of the Arthur Hamilton standard "Cry Me a River", as well as "Magnolia", an early song of J. J. Cale's. "I Believe", which was a moderate hit in the United States, was included in a special song collection compact disc sold around the same time by fashion retailer Banana Republic. A music video directed by Paul Boyd for "I Believe" aired successively on The Box, VH1, and MuchMusic from August 1997 through February 1998.

There are two versions of the album, the alternate having been released in Europe. The cover art is virtually the same for both; in the European release, Jai's face is positioned at the center and occupies the entire frame, and his name and the album's title appear in the lower-left corner with the title both reduced in size and superimposed over his name. More significantly, alternate takes of the songs "Heaven" and "Wishing the Rain Away" appear on these different versions.

Critical reception 

The Allmusic review by Stephen Thomas Erlewine awarded the album four out of five stars, describing it as "a stylish amalgam of jazzy sophisti-pop, Motown, swinging '60s rock, trip hop and contemporary soul. While the songwriting in Heaven is uneven, Jai's voice is consistently thrilling, soaring to new soulful heights. That voice – along with songs that show how powerful his updated blue-eyed soul can be, like "I Believe" and "Don't Give Me Away" — is what makes Heaven such a promising and successful debut."

Track listing

Credits

Personnel 
Jai (Jason Rowe) – lead and backing vocals
Christopher Bemand – keyboards
Joel Bogen – guitar, keyboards
Andy Duncan – percussion ("Heaven")
The Electra Strings – strings ("Don't Give Me Away" and "Wishing the Rain Away")
Pete Giordino – Hammond organ ("Heaven")
Preston Heyman – percussion
Paul Hirsch – Hammond organ
Honey – barking ("Open")
Larry Fifield – additional backing vocals
Claudia Fontaine – backing vocals
Tony Ford – backing vocals
John Miller – additional drums ("Magnolia")
Olivia – small child ("Don't Give Me Away")
Chuck Sabo – drums
Jason Silver – piano and Rhodes piano ("Magnolia"); additional backing vocals
Phil Spalding – bass

Production 
Christopher Bemand – programming
Joel Bogen – producer, programming
Paul Boswell – agent
Andy Duncan – additional programming ("Heaven")
Steve Fitzmaurice – mixing
Dave Novik – A&R
Dick O'Dell – management
Chris Porter – additional production and mixing ("Heaven")
Stylorouge – design
Norman Watson – cover photograph
Rob Watson – additional programming ("Don't Give Me Away" and "You Split Me")
Tim Young – mastering (Metropolis, UK)
Leon Zervos – mastering (Absolute Audio, USA)

Charts 
A couple of months following its release, Heaven made a brief appearance on the Billboard Heatseekers Album Chart during the week of 31 January 1998, where it ranked at number 49.

Notes

References

External links 

1997 albums
Jason Rowe albums
Music videos directed by Paul Boyd
RCA Records albums